Kalinino is a rural locality (a village) in Akkuzevsky Selsoviet, Ilishevsky District, Bashkortostan, Russia. The population was 38 as of 2010. There is 1 street.

Geography 
Kalinino is located 28 km northwest of Verkhneyarkeyevo (the district's administrative centre) by road. Akkuzevo is the nearest rural locality.

References 

Rural localities in Ilishevsky District